Thekra bint Mohammed Al Dali (September 16, 1966 – November 28, 2003), better known as Thekra (also spelled Thikra, Zekra or Zikra, meaning memory or memorial), was a Tunisian singer.

Career 

Thekra started performing at school.  In 1980, she performed on the TV show "Fan Wa Mawahib" (Arabic:  فن و مواهب), after which she joined the show's chorus. In 1983, her first recording was made, of a song composed by Abdul Hameed Khareef. In the same year, she performed at the Carthage festival.

Later she joined the vocal group section of the Tunisian Radio and TV Establishment's national band.  There, she met Abdul Rahman Al Ayyadi, who composed many of her later songs. Thekra became known for her powerful voice and her ability to perform many kinds of Arabic music genres, including Qasa'ed, Muwashshah and Taarab songs.

Tunisia 

During the 10 years before moving to Egypt, she released 30 songs in Tunisia. 28 of them were composed by Abdulrahman Al Ayyadi. Some of her successful singles in Tunisia included:

 "Liman Ya Hawa Satakoon Hayati Wa Kaifa Sa'Arifo Ma Howa Aati?" (Arabic script: لمن يا هوى ستكون حياتي وكيف سأعرف ما هو آتي?) – To whom does my life belong and how should I know how it will end up?
 "Habeebi Tammin Fo'adi" (Arabic script: حبيبي طمن فؤادي) – My beloved, comfort my heart
 "Ela Hadhn Ommi Yahin Fo'adi" (Arabic script: الى حضن امي يحن فؤادي) – My heart misses my mother's hug
 "Wadda'at Roohi Ma'ah Min Youm Ma Wadda'ani" (Arabic script: ودعت روحي معاه من يوم ما ودعني) – I said good bye to my soul which is gone with him since the day he said good bye to me

In 1990, she had an argument with Abdulrahman Al Ayyadi, who was her fiancé at the time, because he did not want any other person to compose for her. She left and joined a new group, Zakharif Arabiya (Arabic script: زخارف عربية).

Libya 
She stayed for a while in Libya and released many songs written and composed by Libyan poets and composers including Mohammed Hassan, Ali Al Kailani, Abdullah Al Mansoor and Salman Al-Tarhooni. Her last album released in Libya was "Nafsi Azeeza", written by the poet Al-Tarhooni, which won best performance and lyrics in the Sharm el-Sheikh festival in Egypt.

Egypt 

After her career in Libya, she returned to Tunisia for a time, but then moved to Egypt. In Egypt, she met the musician Hani Mihanna who produced two of her albums. Wehyati Andak in 1995 was successful in the Arab world: until then she was known in the West side of the Arab world, but after that album she became widely known all over the Arab world. Mihnna also produced her second album, As'har Ma'ah Sertak, in 1997.

A few months later in 1997 she released Al Asami with a different producer and in 2000 Yana. Her last album in Egypt was Youm Aleek, released in 2003, only three days before her murder.

Her most successful singles performed in Egyptian Arabic were:
 "Wehyati Andak" (Arabic script: و حياتي عندك).
 "Mish Kol Hob" (Arabic script: مش كل حب).
 "Youm Aleek" (Arabic script: يوم عليك).
 "Bahlam Beloa'ak" (Arabic script: بحلم بلقاك).
 "Al Asami" (Arabic script: الاسامي).
 "Yana" (Arabic script: يانا).
 "Ya Azeez Aini" (Arabic script: يا عزيز عيني).
 "Law Ya Habeebi" (Arabic script: لو يا حبيبي).
 "Ya Khofi" (Arabic script: يا خوفي).
 "Kul Elli Lamouni" (Arabic script: كل اللي لاموني).

GCC and Persian Gulf region 

Thekra performed many songs and album in different Arab dialects including Gulf Arabic, also known as "Khaleeji".

She released many Khaleeji albums and they are:
 Thekra (1998).
 Thekra 2 (2002).
 Thekra 3 (2003).
 Wish Maseeri (2003)
 Wa Tabqa Thekra (2004) released after her death
 Aghani A'ajabatni (2004) released after her death

She also performed duets with several Khaleeji singers, including with Abo Bakir Salim in the song "Mishghil Al Tafkeer", and a duet with Mohammed Abdo in 2003. She was going to perform a duet with Abdullah Al Rowaished but was killed before it could be recorded.

Her most successful singles in Gulf Arabic were:
 "Elain El Youm" (Arabic script: الين اليوم).
 "Wainik Enta" (Arabic script: وينك انت).
 "Ma Feeni Shai" (Arabic script: ما فيني شي).
 "Ahibbik Moot" (Arabic script: احبك موت).
 "Ghayib" (Arabic script: غايب).
 "Al Jarh" (Arabic script: الجرح).
 "Qalaha" (Arabic script: قالها).
 "Hatha Ana" (Arabic script: هذا انا).
 "Al Mesafir" (Arabic script: المسافر).

Death 
A day before her death, she was in Libya where she performed a concert and she met al-Gaddafi. The same night, she sang a song based a poem written by Ali Al Keilani, and at a time where there were large tensions between Saudi and Libya. The poem had words where it criticised the corruption of the Saudi government and how they shouldn't be in charge of Hajj in Mecca which was a large attack on the House of Saud.

On November 28, 2003, the same 4 people with her in Libya were found dead. She was murdered by an unknown despite many people believing it was her husband. A team of doctors, who examined her body, released a medical report after an autopsy was complete stating that she was shot with 26 bullets all over her body and had remained alive for only 15 minutes afterward. The other three victims of the crime, Thekra's secretary was shot 22 times and her business manager received 18 bullets before passing away alongside her husband receiving 3 bullets in the mouth. Despite the medical examiner ruling the incident to be suicide, one bullet to the mouth would do the job where as it is questionable why there were three.

When her death was reported, her body was transported by Al Waleed bin Talal's (Saudi prince) private plane to avoid suspicion and show “solidarity”.

After her death, many celebrities from the Arab world flew to Tunisia and Egypt to attend her funeral. Singers who performed Thekra's songs in their concerts included Assala, Sherine, Ghada Rajab, Elissa, and Samira Said.

Latifa did not perform any of Thekra's songs, but instead recorded a Tunisian folk song called "Fi Al Ghorba" and dedicated it to her; she also dedicated her Murex d'Or award for best female singer in 2003 to her, and asked them to play a tribute to Thekra instead of her.

Singles 

 "Al Hilm Al Arabi" FEAT. others (Arabic script: الحلم العربي).
 "Ommahu" (English: Oh Mam). A trio with Ali Al Hajjar & Moniem. (Arabic Script: أماه)
 "Nihlam Eih?" A duet FEAT. Angham (Arabic script: نحلم إيه؟).
 "Hilmina Al Wardi" A duet FEAT. Mohammed Abdo (Arabic script: حلمنا الوردي).
 "Ya Hajiri" (Arabic script: يا هاجري).
 "Al Asmaraniya" (Arabic script: الاسمرانيه).
 "Baghdad La Tata'allami" FEAT. others (Arabic script: بغداد لا تتألمي).

Videography 

 "Ya Khoofi" (Arabic script:يا خوفي).
 "Wehyati Andak" (Arabic script:و حياتي عندك).
 "Al Asami" (Arabic script:الأسامي).
 "Al Hilam Al Arabi" (with other Arab singers) (Arabic script:الحلم العربي).
 "Kol Elli Lamooni" (Arabic script:كل اللي لاموني).
 "Allah Ghalib" (Arabic script:الله غالب).
 "Qalaha" (Arabic script:قالها).
 "Elain El Youm" (Arabic script:الين اليوم).
 "Al Jarh" (Arabic script:الجرح).
 "Atfaal" (Arabic script:أطفال).
 "Wala Arif" (A duet FEAT. Ehab Tawfiq) (Arabic script:ولا عارف).
 "Nihlam Eih?" (A duet FEAT. Angham) (Arabic script:نحلم ايه؟).
 "Youm Aleek" (2003) (Arabic script:يوم عليك).
 "Bahlam Beloqak" (Arabic script:بحلم بلقاك) She shot parts of it before her death but the video was never completed so the idea was changed, it was montaged to make her appear as a ghost.
 "Law Ya Habeebi" (Arabic script:لو يا حبيبي) She shot parts of the clip mentioned above "Bahlam Beloqak" before her death but the video was never completed so the idea was changed, it was montaged to make her appear as a ghost.

References

1966 births
2003 deaths
Deaths by firearm in Egypt
People murdered in Egypt
Rotana Records artists
20th-century Tunisian women singers
Tunisian murder victims